Kempville is an unincorporated community in Smith County, Tennessee, United States. It is located along State Route 85 in a hilly area northeast of Carthage.  Kempville Branch, a tributary of Defeated Creek, flows through the community.

Kempville was probably named for a family of early settlers in the area.

References

External links

Unincorporated communities in Smith County, Tennessee
Unincorporated communities in Tennessee